The 1952 Denver Pioneers football team was an American football team that represented the University of Denver as a member of the Skyline Conference during the 1952 college football season. In their fifth and final season under head coach Johnny Baker, the Pioneers compiled a 3–7 record (0–7 against conference opponents), finished last out of eight teams in the conference, and were outscored by a total of 190 to 143.

Schedule

References

Denver
Denver Pioneers football seasons
Denver Pioneers football